Medimix is an Indian brand of ayurvedic/herbal soap manufactured and marketed by AVA Cholayil Private Limited and  Cholayil Private Limited, a Chennai-based company. The brand was founded by Dr. V. P. Sidhan from Valapad, Thrissur, Kerala.

In 1969 Dr. Sidhan combined a recipe 18 herbs to make a skin care soap. Medimix is currently available in four types of soap, three of body wash, five facial cleansers and hygiene products like hand wash and sanitizers.  

In 2011, Medimix was judged the 87th-most trusted brand in India and the 15th-most trusted brand in the personal care category according to the Brand Equity Survey conducted by the Economic Times.

Medimix has grown synonymous with ‘skin care, the natural way’ and for generations women, indeed entire families, have placed their trust on the Medimix range of products. Currently available in eight variants of ayurvedic soap, six variants of Herbal body wash, six variants in the  face wash, herbal hand wash, ayurvedic hair shampoo & conditioner, and a few other products, Medimix is expanding its range and bringing natural skin care to more people across the world.

References

Indian soap brands
Ayurveda